Hyundai Hysco Co., Ltd. was a steel company of Hyundai Motor Group, headquartered in Ulsan, South Korea. Hysco produced automotive steel sheet products and various steel pipes. The company was merged with Hyundai Steel in July 2015.

History
Hyundai Hysco was established under the name Kyung-il Industrial Co., Ltd. in 1975.  The company was renamed to Hyundai Pipe Co., Ltd. in 1980 soon after the completion of its full-scale steel pipe plant in 1979. As a scheme to be a leading steel company in the global market, the company was renamed once again to Hyundai Hysco in February 2001.

In November 1982, two years after the steel pipe plant was built, Hyundai Hysco was awarded the 'US$100 Million Export Tower' in November 1982. In 1997, the company set a new record in the steel industry by producing over 10 million tons of steel pipes.

For over 20 years, Hyundai Hysco has been the leading company in the Korean steel pipe industry. After taking the largest market share in the steel pipe industry, they entered the market for cold rolled products, which require the highest level of technology among other sectors of the steel industries. Hyundai Hysco has begun the commercial production of cold rolled products in April 1999. Since then, Hyundai Hysco set numerous records in the area of cold rolling, rewriting the history of Korean steel industries. Hyundai Hysco's achievements include the building of a full capacity system in less than one year from the commencement of commercial production and producing 5 million tons of automotive steel products in five years. In 2004, Hyundai Hysco took over an old and standstill works, Hanbo Steel, in Dangjin, in a consortium with Hyundai Steel.

Hyundai Hysco now operates Global Steel Service Center, Automotive Parts Business, Steel Pipe Products, and Resource Development as four core business after partial merger with Hyundai Steel in 2013.

Operations
Hysco's corporate office was located in Seoul, and it also operated works in Ulsan, South Korea with operations worldwide. Hyundai The company operated a steel pipe facility in Korea, eleven overseas processing centers, and three overseas offices internationally.

Ulsan Works
Ulsan works, located at Ulsan-Si Buk-Gu Yumpo-dong.

Overseas Works
Hysco has eleven overseas steel service centers in total. There are four steel service centers in China, one in India, four in Europe, two in the US. Hysco also has three sales offices in Houston, LA in US and Tokyo in Japan. Lastly, Hysco operates ASPI office in India to produce automotive pipe with Sumitomo.

Brief history

1970
 1975.03 Established Kyung-il Co., Ltd.
 1979.05 Completed construction on the steel pipe mill

1980
 1980.05 Changed name to Hyundai Pipe Co., LTD.
 1981.10 Obtained mill approval by Lloyd's Register of Shipping

1990
 1997.04 Started construction on the cold rolling mill
 1999.03 Completed construction on the cold rolling mill

2000
 2000.11 Received Three Hundred Million-Dollar Export Award
 2001.01 Changed company name to Hyundai Hysco
 2003.11 Completion of Beijing Factory
 2004.10 Opening of Dangjin Factory
 2005.01 Exceed 10 million tons cold rolled steel sheet production
 2005.05 Started commercial production of Hydroforming product
 2006.01 Completed establishment of PCI system
 2006.08 Completion of Dangjin Factory
 2007.01 Completion of Jiangsu Factory (China)
 2007.08 Completion of India Factory
 2008.01 Transferred to Seoul Jamwon Office Building

2010

 2013.12 Partial merger with Hyundai Steel for Cold-Rolled Sheet reorganization

See also
 Hyundai Mobis
 Hyundai Motor Company
 Kia Motors
 List of steel producers

References

External links
 Hyundai Hysco Homepage

Auto parts suppliers of South Korea
Hyundai Motor Group
Steel companies of South Korea

fr:Hyundai Hysco